The women's 3 metre springboard, also reported as plongeons du tremplin (English: trampoline diving), was one of five diving events on the diving at the 1924 Summer Olympics programme. The competition was actually held from both 3 metre and 1 metre boards. The competitors performed six dives of their choice. The competition was held on Thursday 17 July 1924, and Friday 18 July 1924. Seventeen divers from seven nations competed.

Results

First round

The three divers who scored the smallest number of points in each group of the first round advanced to the final.

Group 1

Group 2

Final

References

Sources
 
 

Women
1924
1924 in women's diving
Div